The code of entry and residence of foreigners and right of asylum, in French "code de l'entrée et du séjour des étrangers et du droit d'asile" (CESEDA), is the legal code compiling French laws and regulations related to the rights of foreigners on French soil which was created on November 24, 2004 order proposed by Dominique de Villepin, then French minister of the interior in the government led by Jean-Pierre Raffarin.

Origins 
From the end of World War II, the French foreigners law has been constantly modified. On November 2, 1945 an order set the rules concerning the entry and residence of foreigners in the French territory. Between 1993 and 2003, there has not been a year without a reform of the law of foreigners. This made the law complex and hard to grasp. The codification aimed to clear legal  inconsistencies and to improve the coherence of the legislation. 

The code of entry and residence of foreigners and right of asylum was created by the November 24, 2004 order proposed by Dominique de Villepin, then French minister of the interior in the government led by Jean-Pierre Raffarin. It follows the prescriptions passed on November 2, 1945 concerning the conditions of entry and residence of foreigners in France, and the July 25, 1952 law on asylum right. It came into force on March 1, 2005. The reglementation part was published on November 15, 2006.

Content 
The code of entry and residence of foreigner and the right of asylum compiles legal provisions and reglementations related to foreigner in France : 

 Entry on the French territory : conditions of entry, visa, and holding area
 Residency : residence permits, conditions, assisted voluntary return program
 Family reunification 
 Removal mesures : administrative detention, deportation, expulsion
 Asylum right

See also 
Europe Refugee Crisis
Immigration to France

References 

Refugees in France
Right of asylum in France
2004 in France